This is a list of international prime ministerial trips made by Matteo Renzi, who served as the 56th Prime Minister of Italy from 22 February 2014 until his resignation on 12 December 2016.

Summary of international trips

2014 
The following international trips were made by Prime Minister Matteo Renzi in 2014:

2015 
The following international trips were made by Prime Minister Matteo Renzi in 2015:

2016 

The following international trips were made by Prime Minister Matteo Renzi in 2016:

References 

Renzi, Matteo
Foreign relations of Italy
Renzi, Matteo